The 1939–40 season would have been Manchester United's 44th season in the Football League, and their second season back in the top flight after playing in the Second Division in 1937–38. However, due to the outbreak of war in Europe in September 1939, the league season was abandoned after just three games and the results expunged from the records. For this reason, appearances made and goals scored in the Football League matches that were played do not contribute to a player's overall appearances and goals record.

Many of Manchester United's players went off to fight in the war, but for those who remained, the Football League organised a special War League. The War League was originally split into ten regional divisions (Manchester United were placed in the Western Division), in accordance with the Government's 50-mile travel limit. A War League Cup was also set up to replace the FA Cup, which had also been interrupted at the preliminary round phase. United finished the league season with a record of 14 wins and 8 losses, and also reached the second round of the cup before losing to eventual runners-up, Blackburn Rovers.

First Division

War League Western Division

Pld = Matches played; W = Matches won; D = Matches drawn; L = Matches lost; GF = Goals for; GA = Goals against; GAvg = Goal average; Pts = Points

War League Cup

References

Manchester United F.C. seasons
Manchester United